Stavros Petavrakis (born 9 November 1992) is a Greek professional footballer who plays as a left-back for Super League 2 club Panserraikos.

Career statistics

Honours

Club
AEK Athens
Football League 2: 2013–14 (6th Group)
Football League: 2014–15 (South Group)

Veria
Football League: 2020–21 (North Group)

Individual
Best Young Player of Football League 2: 2012–13

References

External links

1992 births
Living people
Greek footballers
Diagoras F.C. players
Rouf F.C. players
Fostiras F.C. players
AEK Athens F.C. players
Panthrakikos F.C. players
PAS Lamia 1964 players
Doxa Drama F.C. players
Veria NFC players
Panserraikos F.C. players
Association football defenders
People from Rhodes
Sportspeople from the South Aegean